The 2019 Women’s Euro Beach Soccer Cup was the fourth edition of the Women's Euro Beach Soccer Cup, an annual European beach soccer championship for women's national teams, organised by Beach Soccer Worldwide (BSWW). The event was revealed on 25 April 2019.

Six nations took part in a three-day competition, hosted in the same location as the previous two editions, Nazaré, Portugal, between 5 and 7 July, alongside the first stage of the men's 2019 Euro Beach Soccer League. It was the final edition of the competition, being replaced by the Women's Euro Beach Soccer League.

Russia were the defending champions and successfully retained their crown, defeating Spain in the final to win their second successive title, also becoming the first nation to win the tournament more than once.

Teams
For the first time, all six teams from the previous edition of the championship returned and hence no teams made their debut.

Venue

All matches took place at the Estádio do Viveiro on Praia de Nazaré (Nazaré Beach) with a capacity of 2,200, except for one match that took place on an external, purpose built pitch known as "Pitch 2".

Draw
Unlike in previous editions, the draw was not held publicly and its details were not disclosed.

Group stage
The teams compete in a round robin format. The winners of the groups proceed to contest the final. The respective group runners-up and third placed nations play each other in consolation matches to decide third through sixth place in the final standings.

Matches are listed as local time in Nazaré, WEST (UTC+1)

Group A

Group B

Play-offs

Fifth place play-off

Third place play-off

Final

Awards
After the final, the following awards were presented.

Winners trophy

Individual awards

Goalscorers
4 goals

 Molly Clark
 Anna Cherniakova
 Marina Fedorova
 Nathalie Schenk
 Eva Bachmann

3 goals

 Veronika Pychova
 Aaike Verschoor
 Michaela Culova
 Sarah Kempson
 Anastasiia Gorshkova
 Carla Morera

2 goals

 Gemma Hillier
 Katie James
 Celine van Velsen
 Sandra Kalin
 Pascale Kuffer
 Nancy Loth
 Chelly Drost
 Andrea Morger
 Bouchra Moudou
 Carolina Gonzalez
 Alba Mellado

1 goal

 Tess Van Der Flier
 Sara Gonzalez
 Alina Grueter
 Martina Folprechtova
 Viktoriia Silina
 Katerina Slavikova
 Lorena Asensio
 Jessica Miras
 Fabiola Vincenz
 Barbora Pomijova
 Aneta Jungova

Own goals

 Mariel Miedema (vs. Russia)
 Veronika Khutornaia (vs. Spain)
 Alina Grueter (vs. Spain)

Source

Final standings

References

External links
Women's Euro Beach Soccer Cup Nazaré 2019, at Beach Soccer Worldwide
European Cup Women's Teams 2019, at Beach Soccer Russia (in Russian)

Women
International association football competitions hosted by Portugal
Beach soccer in Portugal
2019 in beach soccer
2019 in Portuguese sport
Women's Euro Beach Soccer Cup